Augustine Nguyễn Lạc Hóa (c. 1901 – c. 1993) was a refugee Chinese Catholic priest, who arrived in South Vietnam in 1959 and led a militia called the Sea Swallows resisting the Viet Cong in the Ca Mau Peninsula. The "fighting priest" and his "village that refused to die" attracted admiring media stories in the United States, and in 1964 he received the Ramon Magsaysay Award in the Public Service category.

Biography

Hoa fled from Kwangsi Province in Communist China in 1950-51 with over 2,000 parishioners, and spent eight years in Cambodia. In 1959 Hoa with 450 of the refugees settled in Binh Hung on the Ca Mau Peninsula. They created a village and Hoa established a defense force – the Sea Swallows – against the Viet Cong, who were active in the area.

Hoa's success inspired others to join his Sea Swallows, including a company of "Nung tribesmen." Declassified documents would reveal that the Nung fighters were actually a contingent of Nationalist soldiers from the Republic of China.

As the political situation in Saigon deteriorated, Hoa saw the battle turning and little chance of winning. Discouraged, he left Binh Hung, and retired to a parish in Taipei.

Recognition in U.S.
In January 1961, Edward Lansdale visited Hoa and Binh Hung. Back in Washington, he was surprised to find that President John F. Kennedy had taken a personal interest in his report on Hoa, and wanted it published in the Saturday Evening Post. It was attributed to "an American officer." The town of Newburyport, Massachusetts adopted Binh Hung as a sister community, and the Post followed up with another story on Hoa. Other correspondents who took up the story of the Sea Swallows included Dickey Chapelle and Stan Atkinson, who remembered Hoa decades later as the "most unforgettable character" he met in his travels.

See also

References

External links
 Ramon Magsaysay Award Foundation biography 

1908 births
1989 deaths
Hoa people
Vietnamese people of the Vietnam War
Vietnamese anti-communists
20th-century Vietnamese Roman Catholic priests